Gąski  (from 1938-45 ) is a village in the administrative district of Gmina Olecko, within Olecko County, Warmian-Masurian Voivodeship, in northern Poland.

Notable residents 
 Gerhard Olschewski (born 1942), German actor

References

Villages in Olecko County